Wally Haysom (17 December 1897 – 1 November 1982) was an Australian rules footballer who played with Collingwood in the Victorian Football League (VFL).

Haysom was a back pocket defender in Collingwood's 1919 premiership team, one of 16 appearances he made that season. He played another seven games in 1920.

Haysom was the last survivor of the Collingwood 1919 premiership team.

References

1897 births
Collingwood Football Club players
Collingwood Football Club Premiership players
Prahran Football Club players
Australian rules footballers from Victoria (Australia)
1982 deaths
One-time VFL/AFL Premiership players